was a Japanese rock band founded in Tokyo in circa 1992. The group made atmospheric, psychedelic-noise music, and was regarded for its distinctive style in the Tokyo psychedelic music scene. The band produced four albums in its eighteen years of existence and constantly performed live shows, but they remained little-documented and little-known.

In 1992, Shizuka Miura (vocals and rhythm guitar) began composing music and performing by herself, but she soon formed a duo with Maki Miura (lead guitar). Early members also included Jun Kosugi (drums) and Tomoya Hirata (bass), and later the band was established with Tetsuya "Seven" Mugishima (bass) who replaced the first bassist. The group had many lineup changes throughout its history, having been Shizuka and Maki the only permanent members up until Shizuka's death in early 2010.

Shizuka's musical style incorporated elements of psychedelic music, folk music, noise rock, and acid rock, combined atmospheric music with the Japanese neo-psychedelia, and was led by Shizuka's vocals and Maki's guitar. Shizuka's vocals were slow, chanted, haunting, and tremulous—characteristics that connoted sadness and a "gothic atmosphere". Maki's guitar complemented Shizuka's vocals in a gentle plucking of strings, but intermixed a psychedelic-noise guitar playing in contrast to the melodic and serene proceedings.

Of Shizuka's four albums,  (1994) was the band's debut and only studio album. Posthumous releases include  (2021).

History

1992–1994: Early years 
In circa 1992, Shizuka Miura started making music with support from Maki Miura (a veteran musician and former member of Fushitsusha and Les Rallizes Dénudés) who had adapted a poem of hers to music which prompted Shizuka into learning music composition. Shizuka initially wrote three songs that she used for the first of three concerts she independently organized and performed in. Maki attended the third performance of hers and had positive impressions of it, which led to Shizuka and Maki forming a musical duo.

Fushitsusha drummer Jun Kosugi was an early member of the group. In circa September 1993, they appeared in the Tokyo Flashback 3 (a various artists compilation album released by PSF Records) with the song . With this formation and additionally bassist Tomoya Hirata, Shizuka performed at live house Manda-La2 in Tokyo on 8 November 1993. On 12 August 1994, they played at Japan's Studio AMS. Both performances were self-released in circa 1995 on the Hi8 videocassette format with the title . Later, music producer Tetsuya Tanaka remastered the videocassette's footage and reissued it as Hikyoku no Seiseki: Live at Manda-La2 1993 & Studio Ams 1994 on the DVD-Video format in December 2009 in Japan under Tanaka's label Fra, Inc.

1994: Heavenly Persona 
On 22 November 1994, Shizuka's debut and only studio album, was released in Japan by PSF Records. It was conceptualized by Shizuka Miura and dedicated to Japanese dollmaker .
Reception-wise, Mason Jones reviewed Heavenly Persona as a "beautiful CD" and "very fine album", and Steven Lowenthal and Peter Kolovos wrote on NPR that Heavenly Persona "features some of the most straightforward—yet equally magical—music within the PSF catalog".

Musically, Heavenly Persona opens with a harsh-noise psychedelic jam led by Maki Miura's distorted guitar, but soon after the album introduces the band's atmospheric, traditional folk style lead by Shizuka's chanted and plaintive vocals, and Maki's delicate string plucking. The album features piano by Ichirou Nagahara and cello by Takeharu Hayakawa that enhance the "simplistic arrangements of guitar and voice". This release also presents Shizuka's characteristic music contrast on the initially serene, melancholic melodies that develop into crescendos lead by Maki's psychedelic solos.

1995: Live Shizuka and miscellaneous appearance 
In 1995, Shizuka's first CD live album, Live Shizuka, was released in the United States by New Yorker record label Persona Non Grata. In this release, the band maintained atmosphere akin to 4AD releases with further yet meticulous use of guitar effects and noise that distinguished the group's musical style from the Japanese neo-psychedelia. Shizuka was responsible for the vocals and guitar, Maki for the lead guitar, Jun for the drums, Tomoya for the bass, and Amano Onkyo Giken for the recording engineering.

Also in 1995, Shizuka appeared in the compilation album of various artists Tokyo Flashback 4, released by PSF Records. It is the album's sixth track, named . In the music production of this song, the band completed all the arrangement in a single-take, contrasting the group's usual creative process, which was to initially "listen to Shizuka singing the lyrics, jam together", and only then "arrange the song". For this piece, Shizuka Miura said she used texts from the Japanese epic poem Hotsuma Tsutae as lyrics to complete the song.

In 17 and 18 June 1995, Shizuka Miura and Maki Miura performed live with Takashi Mizutani at Art Gallery Hasegawa, Tokyo.

1995–1997: Lineup changes, and American tour 
Maki Miura told that Shizuka's first bass player "couldn't keep up with" the band members' pace, having Maki himself to write the songs' bass lines. He also said that situation became a major problem for the band, since its members were "used to completing the arrangement in the [recording] studio". Sometime after the release of Heavenly Persona in 1994, singer Shizuka, Maki, and Jun met Japanese musician Tetsuya Mugishima, also known as "Seven". Even though Seven originally was a guitarist, he was invited to be the bassist on Shizuka for his competency as a bass player and skills in composing bass lines. With Seven's joining, the band was formally established.

In 1995, the band did three live performances with that formation. One was at live venue ShowBoat in Kōenjikita on 20 July 1995. Another was at live venue Namba Bears in City of Osaka on 10 September 1995. Both performances were recorded and later released on the CD format in 2000 and 2008, respectively. The remaining show was at the La Mama venue in Shibuya on 17 September 1995. After those three live shows, Seven, and soon afterwards Jun Kosugi, left the band for "personal reasons". This led to many lineup changes and to a decline in the group's activities. Despite these events, Maki said they had "never disbanded", and were waiting for Seven and Kosugi to rejoin the band since they preferred that formation.

Sometime between 1995 and 1997, Mason Jones helped organizing a tour in the United States for the band. There were shows in San Francisco and Los Angeles. They went twice to a local radio station, one of which was a live performance.

On 15 July 1996, Shizuka had its song  from Heavenly Persona released in the United Kingdom in the compilation album Tokyo Invasion! Volume 1: Cosmic Kurushi Monsters by Virgin Records.

On 22 April 1997, Shizuka's song  was released in the compilation album Land of the Rising Noise,  2 in the United States by independent record label Charnel Music, owned by Mason Jones. The cover art of this various artists album features a doll made by Shizuka Miura.

2000–2002: Reunition, Tokyo Underground '95, and Le Weekend festival 
In 2000, the group reunited with the previously established members: Shizuka, Maki, Jun, and Seven. In that year, they released a live album recorded in 1995 during a 40-minute performance in a Tokyo nightclub, titled Tokyo Underground 20, Jul '95, which was published in the United States by the American label Last Visible Dog. As Shizuka's previous albums, Tokyo Underground '95 maintains the band's melancholic and contrasting music style, with Shizuka's chanted vocals, and Maki's psychedelic guitar solos. However, this album has different characteristics in relation to other Shizuka releases: it starts with a 1-minute recording of a live PA by a previous artist, and, as described by Eclipse Records, the "disc gives off a slightly different 'in a nightclub' aura to Shizuka's zoned-out balladry".

In circa October or November 2001, The Wire magazine invited the band to play at the Le Weekend festival in Stirling, Scotland. In this way, Shizuka was scheduled to play at 19:30 on 25 April 2002 at the Stirling Tolbooth music venue. There, they faced some problems: Maki had stomach related health issues; and immigration-wise to get into Scotland because Shizuka members' identities were under suspicion. Nevertheless, the band made it to the Tolbooth "with a last-minute appearance", and became the first artist to perform in the 2002 edition of that festival.

2008: Traditional Aesthetics 
On 25 April 2008, a performance by Shizuka from September 1995 at Namba Bears was released in Japan by PSF Records as a live album, titled . As characteristics of Shizuka's musical style, the songs in Traditional Aesthetics are simple. They feature a slow tempo, Shizuka singing elegies in plaintive, chanted, and tuneless vocals, and Maki's psychedelic guitar playing. Members in this recording are Shizuka (vocals and guitar), Maki (lead guitar), Jun (drums), and Seven (bass).

2010: Shizuka Miura's death, and Owari no Nai Yume 
On circa 31 January 2010, Shizuka Miura died. As a tribute to Shizuka, a concert of the band performing at ShowBoat on 30 December 2008 was released on the DVD-video format by PSF Records on 25 April 2010: . Members in Owari no Nai Yume are Shizuka (vocals, guitar), Maki (lead guitar), Kazuhide Yamaji (bass), and Katsumi Honjo (drums).

2017–present: Posthumous releases 
On 24 May 2017, a live recording from March 2009 at Kameido Hardcore of the song  was included by Super Fuji Discs on a various artists compilation: Tokyo Flashback: P.S.F. — Psychedelic Speed Freaks. The American label Black Editions later reissued it in 2019.

In February 2018, the Bandcamp Daily published that Black Editions will reissue a remastered version of Heavenly Persona, having been the music producer Kris Lapke "enlisted to remaster" it.

In June 2021, French label An'archives released a new Shizuka live album titled  that had been announced in 2019. It is a double-sided vinyl with a total of 8 tracks taken from a previously unreleased live recording in 2001.

Musical style 
Shizuka's musical style features simple arrangements, going from serene and melancholic traditional folk to the Japanese psychedelic harsh noise—a characteristic contrast present in their recordings which commonly develops into crescendos. It is led primarily by Shizuka's vocals and Maki's guitar: Shizuka's vocals are chanted, slow, monotone, and plaintive—often connoting sadness, while Maki's guitar is characterized both by a simple, delicate string plucking, and by emotive distorted psychedelic-noise solos as influences from Maki's previous works in acts like Fushitsusha and Les Rallizes Dénudés. The band's sound and atmosphere is comparable to releases on 4AD.

Shizuka was described as distinctive by music journalist Alan Cummings and reviewer Andrea Moed, and as unique by reviewer Dean McFarlane, specially to the Japanese neo-psychedelia. This is attributable to the band's meticulous use of guitar effects while also featuring psychedelic-noise in contrast to Shizuka's haunting, madrigal-resembling vocals. Shizuka's vocals were imperfect and tuneless, but these aspects added an emotional edge as part of the band's style.

Members

Former members 
  — vocals, guitar (1992–2010), bells (1994)
  — guitar (1992–2010)
  — drums (1992– 1997, 2000– 2002)
  — bass (1992–1995)
  — bass (1995, 2000–2002)

Guest and session musicians 
   — bass, cello (1994)
  — piano (1994)
  — guitar (1995)
  — bass (1997)
  — guitar (2000), bass (2002, 2008–2009)
  — guitar (2001)
  — drums (2008–2009)

Timeline

Discography 

Studio albums
  (1994)

Live albums
 Live Shizuka (1995)
 Tokyo Underground 20, Jul '95 (2000)
  (2008)
  (2021)

Video albums
 
  (2009, reissue)
  (2010)

Notes

References

Non-English citations

Further reading

External links 

 Shizuka (band) at Myspace

Japanese rock music groups
Japanese psychedelic rock music groups
Japanese noise rock groups
Musical groups established in 1992
Musical groups disestablished in 2010
Musical groups from Tokyo
P.S.F. Records artists